Marjan Zaninović (2 February 1911 – 24 December 1968) was a Croatian rower. He competed in the men's eight event at the 1936 Summer Olympics.

References

1911 births
1968 deaths
Croatian male rowers
Olympic rowers of Yugoslavia
Rowers at the 1936 Summer Olympics
Sportspeople from Šibenik